HMS Wolverine was a  of the Royal Navy launched on 15 January 1910. She was built by Cammell Laird at Birkenhead.

Design and construction
Wolverine was one of three s ordered from the shipbuilder Cammell Laird as part of the 1908–1909 shipbuilding programme. The Beagles were not built to a standard design, with detailed design being left to the builders of individual ships in accordance with a loose specification. Displacement was  normal. Five Yarrow boilers fed direct-drive Parsons steam turbines driving three propeller shafts. Gun armament consisted of one BL 4 inch naval gun Mk VIII and three QF 12-pounder 12 cwt guns. Torpedo armament consisted of two 21 inch (533 mm) torpedo tubes. Two spare torpedoes were carried.

Wolverine was laid down at Laird's Birkenhead shipyard on 26 April 1904 and was launched on 15 January 1910.

Service history
On commissioning, Wolverine joined the First Destroyer Flotilla, part of the Home Fleet. In 1912, the Royal Navy's destroyer flotillas were re-organized, with the Beagles joining the Third Destroyer Flotilla. Wolverine remained part of the Third Flotilla until August 1913, but had transferred to the Fifth Destroyer Flotilla, part of the Royal Navy's Mediterranean Fleet by November that year.

At the outbreak of the First World War, Wolverine was still in the Mediterranean, as a member of the 5th Destroyer Flotilla. The flotilla, including Wolverine, was involved in the pursuit of the German battlecruiser . Wolverine was one of eight destroyers deployed by Rear Admiral Ernest Troubridge to assist his squadron of Armoured cruisers in stopping the German ships escaping to Austrian waters. When it was realised that Goeben and Breslau were not heading to Austria, Troubridge left these destroyers behind as they did not have sufficient coal left for a high speed pursuit, and set off southwards on the night of 6/7 August 1914 with his four Armoured cruisers. He called off his pursuit later that night because he could not intercept the German squadron until daylight, when Goebens superior speed and armament would give the Germans a significant advantage.  On 1 November 1914 she and the destroyer  sank a Turkish armed yacht, believed to be involved in minelaying operations, in the Gulf of Smyrna.

In 1915, along with numerous other Beagle,  and  destroyers, she took part in the naval operations in the Dardanelles Campaign. Early operations involved escorting trawlers when they attempted to sweep Turkish minefields in the narrows of the Dardanelles. During the initial landings at ANZAC Cove and at Cape Helles, Wolverine joined several other destroyers in minesweeping operations in the Dardanelles straits to allow  Allied battleships to bombard Turkish positions. On 28 April, Wolverine was sweeping in conjunction with sister ship  (the sweep wire was run between the two ships) when she was hit on the ship's bridge by a Turkish shell, which killed Commander Osmond J. Prentis, Wolverine s captain and two more men. Despite these patrols, the Turkish destroyer  managed to sneak past Beagle and Bulldog on the northern side of the straits and torpedoed and sunk Goliath before successfully escaping. On releasing that Goliath had been torpedoed, Wolverine and Scorpion attempted to cut off the Turkish destroyer, but Muavenet-i Milliye evaded them.

Work included naval artillery support, particular at the Cape Helles beachhead. On 28 June Wolverine provided support for the advancing forces at the Battle of Gully Ravine, helping to break up a Turkish counter attack. She provided cover for the final evacuation from Cape Helles on the night of 8/9 January 1916. From March 1916, Wolverine operated in the Aegean, patrolling the Dodecanese, Sporades and Cyclades  and the Turkish coast, carrying raiding parties of Greek and Cretan irregular troops commanded by the classical scholar John Myres which carried out cattle raids on the Turkish coast.

Wolverine was recalled to home waters and assigned to the 2nd Destroyer Flotilla  now based at Buncrana, near Lough Swilly in the north of Ireland in October 1917. On 12 December 1917, Wolverine sank following a collision with the fleet sweeping sloop Rosemary off the northwest coast of Ireland. Two of Wolverines crew were killed.

References

 

 

Beagle-class destroyers
Ships built on the River Mersey
1910 ships
World War I destroyers of the United Kingdom
Ships sunk in collisions
World War I shipwrecks in the Atlantic Ocean
Shipwrecks of Northern Ireland
Maritime incidents in 1917